HD 70642 b is an extrasolar planet orbiting the star HD 70642 at 3.23 AU distance and takes 5.66 years to revolve. This planet may have systems of moons like Jupiter. This planet was discovered on July 3, 2003. It is located about 95 light-years away in the constellation Puppis.

See also
 55 Cancri d
 Gliese 777 b
 HD 28185 b
 Mu Arae e
 Pi Mensae b

References

External links
 

Puppis
Exoplanets discovered in 2003
Giant planets
Exoplanets detected by radial velocity